Margaret Edwards (born 28 March 1939) is an English former competitive swimmer.

Early life
Edwards was born on 28 March 1939.

Swimming career
She represented Great Britain at the 1956 Summer Olympics in Melbourne, Australia, where she won a bronze medal in the women's 100-metre backstroke in the time of 1:13.1.

At the 1958 British Empire and Commonwealth Games in Cardiff, she won a gold medal and a silver medal in the women's 440-yard medley relay and 110-yard backstroke respectively, while representing England. At the ASA National British Championships she won the 110 yards backstroke title twice (1959, 1961).

See also
 List of Olympic medalists in swimming (women)

References

1939 births
English female swimmers
Living people
Olympic swimmers of Great Britain
Swimmers at the 1956 Summer Olympics
Olympic bronze medallists for Great Britain
Olympic bronze medalists in swimming
Female backstroke swimmers
European Aquatics Championships medalists in swimming
Medalists at the 1956 Summer Olympics
Commonwealth Games medallists in swimming
Commonwealth Games gold medallists for England
Commonwealth Games silver medallists for England
Swimmers at the 1958 British Empire and Commonwealth Games
Medallists at the 1958 British Empire and Commonwealth Games